Prospect Hill Historic District may refer to:

Prospect Hill Historic District (New Haven, Connecticut), listed on the NRHP in New Haven County, Connecticut
Prospect Hill Historic District (Willimantic, Connecticut), listed on the NRHP in Windham County, Connecticut
Prospect Hill Historic District (Bloomington, Indiana)
Prospect Hill Historic District (Cincinnati, Ohio), a historic district also known as Prospect Hill, listed on the NRHP in Hamilton County, Ohio
Prospect Hill (Arlington, Virginia), a former historic mansion whose site is a local historic district
Prospect Hill Historic District (Janesville, Wisconsin), listed on the NRHP in Rock County, Wisconsin
Prospect Hill Historic District (Milwaukee, Wisconsin), listed on the NRHP in Milwaukee County, Wisconsin
Prospect Hill Historic District (Buffalo, New York), listed on the NRHP in Buffalo, New York

See also
Prospect Hill (disambiguation)